Fernbank is a closed station in the town of Fernbank, on the Bairnsdale railway line railway line, in Victoria, Australia. The station was one of 35 closed to passenger traffic on 4 October 1981, as part of the New Deal timetable for country passengers.

It was disestablished as a Staff station on 1 December 1986, with the crossing loop spiked out of service. The crossing loop remains, along with a disused goods platform.

References

Disused railway stations in Victoria (Australia)
Transport in Gippsland (region)
Shire of East Gippsland